Brod may refer to:

People
 Brod (surname)
 Brod Veillon, assistant adjutant general-air for Louisiana

Places
Brod is a common Slavic toponym, meaning "ford" and may refer to:

Bosnia and Herzegovina
 Brod (Brčko), a village in Brčko District, Bosnia and Herzegovina
 Brod, Bosnia and Herzegovina (formerly Bosanski Brod), a town and municipality in Bosnia and Herzegovina
 Brod, Foča, a village in the municipality of Foča, Republika Srpska, Bosnia and Herzegovina

Bulgaria
 Brod, Haskovo Province, a village in the municipality of Dimitrovgrad in Bulgaria
 Kostinbrod, a town in Sofia Province, Bulgaria
 Tsarev Brod, a village in Shumen Province, Bulgaria

Croatia
Brod Moravice, a village and municipality in Gorski Kotar, Croatia
Brod na Kupi, a village in near Delnice in Gorski Kotar, Croatia
Bubnjarački Brod, a village in Žakanje municipality, Croatia
Jurovski Brod, a village in Žakanje municipality, Croatia
 Slavonski Brod, a city in Brod-Posavina County, Croatia

Czech Republic
 Český Brod, a town in the Kolín district, Czech Republic
 Havlíčkův Brod (formerly Německý Brod), a city in the Havlíčkův Brod district, Czech Republic
 Uherský Brod, a town in the Uherské Hradiště district, Czech Republic
 Vyšší Brod, a town in the Český Krumlov district, Czech Republic
 Železný Brod, a town in the Jablonec nad Nisou district, Czech Republic

Poland
 Bród, Garwolin County, a village in Masovian Voivodeship, east-central Poland
 Bród, Radom County, a village in Masovian Voivodeship, east-central Poland
 Bród, West Pomeranian Voivodeship, a village in north-west Poland

Slovakia
 Čierny Brod, a village and municipality in the Galanta district, Slovakia
 Kráľov Brod, a village and municipality in the Galanta district, Slovakia
 Krásny Brod, a village and municipality in the Medzilaborce district, Slovakia

Slovenia
 Brod, Bohinj, a village in Slovenia
 Brod (Črnuče District), a former village in Ljubljana, Slovenia
 Brod (Šentvid District), a former village in Ljubljana, Slovenia

Elsewhere
 Brod, Dragaš, a village in Dragaš, Kosovo
 , a village in Štrpce, Kosovo
 Makedonski Brod, a town and municipality in the Republic of North Macedonia
 Brod (Crna Trava), a village in the municipality of Crna Trava, Serbia
 Brody, Ukraine
 Trochenbrod, a village in Ukraine

See also
 Broda (disambiguation)
 Brode (disambiguation)
 Braude (disambiguation)